The inaugural New Zealand Qantas Television Awards were staged on 12 November 2005 in Auckland, New Zealand.

The awards show and most of the awards were presented by Petra Bagust and Jason Gunn, with additional awards presented by Helen Clark and Don Brash (or more specifically, parodies of them from the TV show Facelift), Oscar Kightley, Dave Fane, Jaquie Brown and Oliver Driver. Prime's Charlotte Dawson served as a backstage correspondent.

Nominees and Winners

Winners are listed first and highlighted in boldface.
Key
 – Non-technical award
 – Technical award

Television

News and Current Affairs

Woman's Day Readers' Choice Awards

References

External links
KiwiTV – 2005 Qantas Television Awards

New Zealand television awards
Qantas Television Awards
Awards
2000s in New Zealand cinema
November 2005 events in New Zealand